Georges Gault was a tennis player competing for France. He finished runner-up to Max Decugis in the singles final of the Amateur French Championships in 1913.

Grand Slam finals

Singles: 1 (0-1)

References

French male tennis players
Year of birth missing
Year of death missing